Laurence Bonici (born 24 September 1957) is a French luger. She competed in the women's singles event at the 1988 Winter Olympics.

References

1957 births
Living people
French female lugers
Olympic lugers of France
Lugers at the 1988 Winter Olympics
Sportspeople from Isère